The 2012 season was Santiago Wanderers's 55th season at the Campeonato Nacional and the 3rd consecutive season in the top flight of Chilean football, since their last promotion in 2009. The club participated in both tournaments of the Primera División, the Apertura and the Clausura, and also participated in the Copa Chile.

In this season, the club celebrated its 120th Anniversary since its foundation in 1892. In July 2012, it was announced that the Estadio Playa Ancha will be renovated, renamed as Elías Figueroa Stadium and expanded to 25,000 seats in order to become a host venue for the upcoming 2015 Copa América. The stadium was closed in October 2012 and partially demolished afterwards, right after the end of the regular season.

In football, the team had regular results during this season, being unable to qualify to the playoffs in both Apertura and Clausura tournaments. The team was managed by Arturo Salah for most of the season, but the bad results and a 14-match winless streak forced him to resign in mid-August. During the last 10 matches of the Clausura tournament, Ivo Basay took the team and managed to save it from relegation to Primera B.

The season covers the period from 1 January to 31 December 2012.

Kits

|
|

Transfers

Apertura 2012
The following players joined the team during the Apertura.
  Boris Sandoval (from  Huachipato)
  Eladio Herrera (from  Deportes Puerto Montt)
  Roberto Órdenes (from  Unión La Calera)
  Juan Gonzalo Lorca (from  US Boulogne)
  Rodrigo Toloza (from  Universidad Católica)
  Pablo Calandria (from  Universidad Católica)

Clausura 2012
In
  Jorge Ormeño (from  Universidad Católica)
  Ariel Cólzera (from  Unión La Calera)
  Mauricio Prieto (from  River Plate)
  Tressor Moreno (from  San Jose Earthquakes)
  Luis Salmerón (from  Ferro Carril Oeste)
Out
  Juan Gonzalo Lorca (to  Deportivo Quito)
  Sebastián Rusculleda (to  Deportivo Quito)
  Nicolás Martínez (to  Real Murcia)
  Sebastián Ubilla (to  Universidad de Chile)

Friendly matches

Pre-season

Mid-season

Copa Decanos de los Andes

Season results

Torneo Apertura

League table

Results summary

Result round by round

Matches

Torneo Clausura

League table

Results summary

Result round by round

Matches

Copa Chile

References

2012
Santiago
Santiago